National Zoo, National Zoological Garden, or National Zoological Park may refer to:
Chilean National Zoo, Santiago, Chile
National Zoo & Aquarium, Canberra, Australia
National Zoo (Malaysia), Kuala Lumpur, Malaysia
National Zoological Gardens (Sri Lanka), Dehiwala, Sri Lanka
National Zoological Gardens of South Africa, Pretoria, South Africa
National Zoological Park (India), Delhi, India
National Zoological Park (United States), Washington D.C., United States
Scottish National Zoological Park (usually called the Edinburgh Zoo), Edinburgh, Scotland